Ioannis Kiriazis (born 19 January 1996) is a Greek track and field athlete who competes in the javelin throw.

His personal best in the event is 88.01 metres set in Austin, Texas in 2017.

International competitions

References

1996 births
Living people
Greek male javelin throwers
Texas A&M Aggies men's track and field athletes